Lucien Carbin (born 7 September 1952) is a Surinamese-Dutch former kickboxer, karateka and trainer. He was the first European Kyokushin karate champion, a world kickboxing champion and a European Savate and Muay Thai champion. As a trainer, he raised 49 world champions in different versions of martial arts.

Biography 
Carbin was born in Para District, Suriname. In 1965, he moved to Amsterdam in the Netherlands. At the age of 18, Carbin joined the military where he took on unarmed combat training. He advanced quickly and after his military duty, two years later in 1972, he enrolled in the martial arts school of Jon Bluming for a Kyokushin karate class. After one year, Carbin mastered the brown belt. He also practiced pencak silat.

In 1976, Carbin was introduced to kickboxing by Jan Plas, a fellow student of Bluming and one of the teachers at the Bluming dojo. Plas went to Japan and learned about kickboxing, and when he returned to the Netherlands, he founded the Mejiro Gym, while Carbin became one of his first students. He became a professional and had a very successful career, winning several world and European titles. He lost only once in his career.

In 1978, Carbin competed in London at the first European Kyokushinkai Championship at Wembley Stadium. There were two categories at the tournament. The first - from 65 to 75 kg, the second - over 75 kg. Carbin weighed 62 kg. During the weigh-in, he had to wear heavy clothes to be allowed to fight. He won the tournament and received the prize from Mas Oyama. According to Carbin, he could not walk after the tournament for several days.

In 1987, Carbin retired from fighting and continued as a trainer. He developed his own kickboxing style, which he named "Carbin All Style". Some of his early students included future champion Rob Kaman. He founded his own gym Fighting Factory Carbin in Bijlmermeer, Amsterdam, which is considered one of the best martial arts gyms in the Netherlands. Carbin brought up multiple world champions, such as Tyrone Spong, Alistair Overeem, Gilbert Yvel, Ilonka Elmont, Sergio Wielzen and Andy Ristie. He also trained Fedor Emelianenko for his fight against Mirko Cro Cop, who came to the Netherlands to prepare for the fight.

Titles and accomplishments

Karate
 1978 Kyokushin European Championship Lightweight Winner
 1982 Kyokushin Dutch Open Lightweight Winner

Muay Thai
 1981 Muay Thai World -63kg Champion
 1984 M.T.B.N. European Super Lightweight Champion

Savate
 1983 CNBF European Cup Lightweight Champion

Fight record (incomplete)

|-  bgcolor="#cfc"
| 1987-04-26 ||Win ||align=left| Mousid Akhamrane || Kampong Manis Fight Night  || Amsterdam, Netherlands || Decision || 5 ||3:00

|-  bgcolor="#cfc"
| ? ||Win ||align=left| Wanpadet Sitkrumai || Thaiboxing || Amsterdam, Netherlands || ||  ||

|-  bgcolor="#fbb"
| 1985- ||Loss||align=left| Richard Sylla || 2nd Paris Savate Internationals || Paris, France || Decision || ||

|-  bgcolor="#cfc"
| 1984-06-19 ||Win ||align=left| Chatchai || Thaiboxing || Amsterdam, Netherlands || ||  ||

|-  bgcolor="#cfc"
| 1984-05-27 ||Win ||align=left| Charry || Fists and Feet || Netherlands || ||  ||

|-  bgcolor="#cfc"
| 1984-03-11 ||Win ||align=left| Lance Lewis || Thaiboxing || Rotterdam, Netherlands || KO (High kick) || 1 ||

|-  bgcolor="#cfc"
| 1984-01-15 ||Win ||align=left| Didier Le Borgne || M.T.B.N. Event	|| Amsterdam, Netherlands || KO (Low kick)|| 1 ||
|-
! style=background:white colspan=9 |

|-  bgcolor="#cfc"
| 1983-03-13 ||Win ||align=left| Jean-Pierre Riboulet || Savate  || Amsterdam, Netherlands || Decision || 5||3:00

|-  bgcolor="#CCFFCC"
| ? || Win ||align=left| Mark Hoyte ||   || Netherlands || KO|| 4 ||

|-  bgcolor="#cfc"
| 1982-06-19 ||Win ||align=left| Richard Sylla || 1982 Savate European Cup, Final || Paris, France || TKO (shoulder injury) || 4||
|-
! style=background:white colspan=9 |

|-  bgcolor="#CCFFCC"
| 1981-09-20 || Win ||align=left| Wankaew Sityodtong ||   || Netherlands || Decision || 5 ||3:00
|-
! style=background:white colspan=9 |

|-  bgcolor="#fbb"
| 1981-06-20 || Loss||align=left| Jean-Marc Trioux  || Savate - France vs Holland || Paris, France || Decision ||  ||

|-  bgcolor="#CCFFCC"
| 1981-05-03 || Win ||align=left| Asumu Inaba || Kickfighters 1, Holland vs Japan  || Amsterdam, Netherlands || KO (Uppercut) || 1 ||2:55

|-  bgcolor="#CCFFCC"
| ? || Win ||align=left| Ronnie Green ||   || Netherlands || KO|| 2 ||

|-  bgcolor="#CCFFCC"
| 1979-10-14 || Win ||align=left| S. Srinop ||   || Amsterdam, Netherlands || Decision || 5 ||3:00

|-  bgcolor="#cfc"
| 1978-05-22 ||Win ||align=left| Michel Nogues ||  || Paris, France || KO||  ||

|-  bgcolor="#CCFFCC"
| 1978-05-08 || Win ||align=left| Chamignon ||  Kickboxing Gala at Appolo Hall || Amsterdam, Netherlands ||  || 2 ||

|-  bgcolor="#cfc"
| 1978-04-17 ||Win ||align=left| J Menacho || Full Contact Holland - Belgium || Amsterdam, Netherlands || KO|| 1 ||

|-  bgcolor="#CCFFCC"
| 1978-02-18 || Win ||align=left| Ron Kuyt||   || Amsterdam, Netherlands ||  ||  ||

|-  bgcolor="#CCFFCC"
| 1977-11-28 || Win ||align=left| Xune Ban ||   || Amsterdam, Netherlands || KO (Right cross) || 2 ||

|-  bgcolor="#cfc"
| 1976-11-29 ||Win ||align=left| D de Preter || Kickboxing Gala at Krasnapolsky Hotel || Amsterdam, Netherlands ||  ||  ||

|-  bgcolor="#cfc"
| 1976-05-31 ||Win ||align=left| Robbie Schumann ||  || Netherlands || TKO (Low kick)||  ||
|-
| colspan=9 | Legend:

References

1952 births
Living people
Dutch male karateka
Dutch male kickboxers
Dutch Muay Thai practitioners
Dutch savateurs
Surinamese male karateka
Surinamese male kickboxers
Surinamese Muay Thai practitioners
Surinamese savateurs
Kickboxing trainers
Muay Thai trainers
Lightweight kickboxers
Kyokushin kaikan practitioners
Silat practitioners
Martial arts school founders
Surinamese emigrants to the Netherlands
People from Para District
Sportspeople from Amsterdam